Meraud Michelle Wemyss Guinness also known as Meraud Guevara (24 June 1904 – 6 May 1993)  was a British painter, writer and poet. She lived most of her life in France, having settled there with her husband, Álvaro Guevara, from whom she was later separated.

Life

She was born Meraud Michelle Wemyss Guinness in London on 24 June 1904 a member of the famous and wealthy Guinness family. She was the older sister of Loel Guinness.

Aged 19 she began studies at Slade School of Art in London and studied under Henry Tonks. From 1926 to 1927 she studied in New York under the sculptor Alexander Archipenko. During her time in New York she also wrote for Vogue magazine. She next moved to Paris, France and studied at both the Académie Julian and Académie de la Grande Chaumière under Francis Picabia and Pierre Tal-Coat.

Although earlier connected romantically to Christopher Wood, also sitting for him, she ultimately married Chilean painter Álvaro Guevara in 1929 and spent most of her life in the south of France, in Aix-en-Provence near him, but not with him, their marriage crumbling after the birth of their daughter
Alladine Guevara in 1931.

In 1943, Guinness' work was included in Peggy Guggenheim's show Exhibition by 31 Women at the Art of This Century gallery in New York.

She died in Paris on 6 May 1993.

References

Tate Gallery
Meraud Guinness Guevara, ma Mère by Alladine Guevara (2007, Rocher)

External links
http://sugswritersblog.blogspot.co.uk/2013/06/meraud-guevara-31-women-number-twelve.html

1904 births
1993 deaths
20th-century English painters
20th-century English women artists
Alumni of the Slade School of Fine Art
Académie Julian alumni
Alumni of the Académie de la Grande Chaumière
Artists from London
British debutantes
English women painters
Meraud